Agrilus cavifrons is a species of metallic wood-boring beetle in the family Buprestidae. It is found in Central America and North America.

References

Further reading

 
 
 

cavifrons
Beetles of Central America
Beetles of North America
Beetles described in 1889
Articles created by Qbugbot